Mohammadabad (also Romanized as Moḩammadābād) is a village in Shaab Jereh Rural District, Toghrol Al Jerd District, Kuhbanan County, Kerman Province, Iran. At the 2006 census, its population was 417, in 115 families.

References 

Populated places in Kuhbanan County